Mehdi Dinvarzadeh (Persian: مهدی دینورزاده) is a retired Iranian footballer and football coach. He was the captain of the Iran national football team and Shahin F.C. during the 1980s. He is currently head coach of Shahrdari Ardabil in Azadegan League

Playing career

Club careers
He began his playing for the Shahbaz F.C. in 1970. In 1972, he joined to the Pas Tehran F.C. His golden ages was in Pas but after Pas's bad results in 1976, he leaves Pas and enjoyed to Shahin F.C. and was retired from playing in 1986.

International careers
He was invited to the Iran national football team in 1977 by Heshmat Mohajerani. He was played for the national team for 26 times . He retired after a match against Turkey in 1984.

Managerial career
He began coaching in Mehr Shemiran in 1990. In 1985, he becomes head coach of Payam Mashhad but less than one year, he was sacked by club. Later, he was appointed as head coach of Aboomoslem and had a good results with Aboomoslem. After near one decade, he return to the football and becomes head coach of Bargh Tehran but was resigned in June 2007. In July 2007, he becomes head coach of Naft Tehran and help club to promoted to the Iran Pro League. From May to June 2010, he was caretaker head coach of Bargh Shiraz. On 1 June 2010, he was appointed as head coach of Damash Gilan and promoted to the Iran Pro League with Damash and was lead Damash in 2011–12 Persian Gulf Cup until week 8. He was resigned on 18 September 2011.

Statistics

Achievements

Player
Iran national football team
 Asian Cup (third place): 1980

Manager
Naft Tehran
 Azadegan League: 2009–10
 2nd Division: 2008–09

Damash Gilan
 Azadegan League: 2010–11

Shahrdari Ardabil
 2nd Division: 2013–14

References

External links

teammelli.com

mardomsalari.com

Iranian football managers
Iranian footballers
Living people
Shahin FC players
pas players
1955 births
Iran international footballers
Bargh Shiraz F.C. managers
Damash Gilan managers
Association football defenders
People from Rasht
1980 AFC Asian Cup players
Sportspeople from Gilan province